Lalit Parimoo is an Indian film and television actor. He is best known for playing the scientist "Dr. Jaikaal" in the superhero series Shaktimaan (1997). Besides Parimoo has acted in a number of Bollywood films, including Haider (2014), where his role was praised critically and as a professor in Agent Vinod (2012). Parimoo has also written a book titled Main Manushya Hoon (I Am a Human).

Filmography

Films
Kaanchli (2020), as Thakur, Director- Dedipya Joshii 
Sita (2019), as Lawyer, Director- Teja 
Kathor (Movie) (2018), as Neelkanth Chaturvedi, Director- Karan Kashyap
  What Will People Say (2017), as Uncle, Director- Iram Haq 
 Panchlait (2017), Director- Prem Prakash Modi 
 Mubarakan (2017), as Paramjeet Jijaji, Director- Anees Bazmee 
 Haider (2014) as Pervez Lone (Polonius), Director- Vishal Bharadwaj 
 Agent Vinod (2012) as Professor, Director- Sriram Raghavan 
 Hum Tum Pe Marte Hain (1999), Director- Nabh kumar 
 Hazaar Chaurasi Ki Maa (1998), Director- Govind Nihlani 
 Ghoonghat (1997), Director- Chinni Prakash 
 Sanshodhan (1996) as Indra Singh, Director- Govind Nihlani 
 Nirmaan (1987), Director- Arun Jaitly

Television
 Kapaal Kundala
 Aahat Season 1 (1995-2001) Episode 76/77-MMM 1857 Episode 196/197 - The Last Reel
 Shaktimaan (1998) as Dr. Jaikaal
 Saaya (Indian TV series) as Police Inspector Makhija
 Kora Kagaz (1998-1999)
 Virat (1997-1998)
 Kangan (2001) as Paritosh
 CID (2002)
 Rishtey (2002) as Thakur (segment: Karan)
 Remix (2004) as Principal Ashish Jambhwal
 Kabhie To Nazar Milao (2006)
 Jhoome Jiiya Re (2007) as Mahesh Sabharwal
 Sunaina (2008) as Principal Shastri
 Kesariya Balam Aavo Hamare Des (2009) as Megh Singh
 Madhubala Ek Ishq Ek Junoon(2012) as Guruji
 Palash Ke Phool, produced by Asha Parekh (Year somewhere around 1989, “Jab Jab mere Ghar Aana Tum, Phool Palash ke le aana…”)
 Scam 1992 - The Harshad Mehta Story  (2020) as CBI Director
 TUMHARE LIYE, doordarshan seril 1991
 Meerabai, doordarshan 1997 as father of Meerabai

Bibliography

References

External links
 
 

Living people
Kashmiri people
Kashmiri Pandits
Kashmiri Hindus
Indian people of Kashmiri descent
Indian television producers
Indian male film actors
Indian male television actors
Indian male soap opera actors
Indian male stage actors
Male actors in Hindi cinema
Male actors in Hindi television
20th-century Indian male actors
21st-century Indian male actors
1964 births